The Appleseed Cast is an American rock band from Lawrence, Kansas. The band was founded in the early days of emo by singer-guitarist Christopher Crisci and drummer Louie Ruiz. The Appleseed Cast has steadily evolved over the release of eight full-length albums with Crisci as the main songwriter. The band has never broken up but the lineup has changed over the years. Currently the band's lineup includes Christopher Crisci, Ben Kimball, Nick Fredrickson and Sean Bergman.

Major acclaim first came in the early 2000s that earned them a 9.0 from Pitchfork for their album set Low Level Owl Vol I and Vol II. The band have enjoyed continued high praise for their work on Two Conversations, Peregrine, Illumination Ritual, and others.

History

Formation and debut

The band formed in 1996 in Southern California with Crisci and Pillar joining bassist Jason Wickersheim and drummer Louie Ruiz under the name December's Tragic Drive (derived from lyrics of the song "Seven" by Sunny Day Real Estate). In 1998, the band – now billed as The Appleseed Cast - signed to Deep Elm Records out of New York — before relocating to North Carolina and released its debut album, The End of the Ring Wars.

Mare Vitalis
In 1999, the band relocated to Lawrence, Kansas without Ruiz, recruiting new drummer Josh "Cobra" Baruth. Later that same year the group entered the Red House studio in Eudora, Kansas, with producer Ed Rose, who would go on to produce the next four Appleseed Cast records. The end result was Mare Vitalis, the band's second full-length album. The album showed progression from the dynamics-heavy rock of The End of the Ring Wars. The album was a concept album on the movements of the sea – encapsulated in such song titles as "Mare Mortis," "Poseidon" and "Kilgore Trout" (also an allusion to the recurring Kurt Vonnegut character of the same name) —, the album is loved by fans, heavy on atmosphere, crescendo, subtly undulating guitar arpeggios and the intricate drumming of Baruth, who clearly brought a new dimension to the band's sonic palette.

The band completed Mare Vitalis in late 1999, but tensions were developing between the band and Wickersheim. In January 2000, Pillar asked his roommate, St. Joseph, Missouri-native Marc Young, if he would be interested in playing bass one show for the band. Young agreed, though the show they spoke of and agreed upon never materialized. Regardless, Wickersheim officially departed the group that same month with Young replacing him on the bass.

Low Level Owl and Lost Songs
After the Mare Vitalis tours, The Appleseed Cast once again entered the studio in late 2000 to begin work on its most ambitious project to date. Eager to fulfill their five-record deal with Deep Elm, the band embarked on a double LP, with Ed Rose once again recording. Low Level Owl Volume One was released on August 21, 2001, with Volume Two following on October 23.

The tracks were woven together into a seamless album-length soundscape with a noticeable post-rock influence. The complex vocal arrangements and enigmatic lyrics were buried in the mix underneath simple, repeated guitar riffs, keyboards, found sounds and Baruth's intricate drum patterns. The non-instrumental pieces containing were connected by ambient-influenced instrumentals. Both Low Level Owl albums were a progression from the more song-oriented Mare Vitalis and a complete shock, the previously disparaging Pitchforkmedia website gave the albums a glowing review. Some critics were put off by the intentionally repetitive nature of the guitar playing and the ambient instrumental interludes.

The band followed Low Level Owl with the release of Lost Songs the following year. The album was a collection of previously unfinished songs recorded shortly after the release of The End of the Ring Wars. In 2002 vocals and overdubs were added and issued as The Appleseed Cast's final release on the Deep Elm label.

Two Conversations
The Appleseed Cast signed with the New York-based indie label Tiger Style Records in 2003 and released Two Conversations shortly afterward. Touring keyboardist Jordan Geiger was officially credited as a band member on the album. Two Conversations was met with mixed reviews.

Some viewed the album with dismay, regarding the more conventional song structures, the less diverse sonic palette and the personal, relationship-driven lyrics as a blatant retreat after the no-holds-barred experimentation, depth and complexity of Low Level Owl. However, others saw the album as an assured combination of the driving emo-rock of their early work subtly embellished with elements of Low Level Owl'''s sound.

During the recording of the album and the subsequent tour, tensions mounted once again. Rumors began to surface in the spring of 2004 that drummer Baruth was no longer a part of the group and were confirmed on the band's website later that year.

Following the confirmation, the band went on hiatus. Crisci began working with his folk-influenced side-project Old Canes and Geiger returned to his band Minus Story. In the meantime Tiger Style faced financial difficulties and dropped their entire roster, including The Appleseed Cast after just one album.

Rebirth and Peregrine
Throughout late 2004 and much of 2005, little was heard on the band's situation. This began to change later in the year as news of drummer auditions began to spread. The band auditioned with many drummers including part-time Old Canes drummer Aaron Coker who later went on to tour with Reggie & The Full Effect. The position eventually went to the Casket Lottery drummer, Nathan "Nate Jr." Richardson.

With a new drummer in place, the band was signed by the Militia Group in 2005 and announced they were returning to the studio in October.

The recording sessions for Peregrine, The Appleseed Cast's sixth full-length album, were held in Cannon Falls, Minnesota, at Pachyderm Studio. The sessions were produced by John Congleton.

Crisci stated on the band's website "...I don't know if I've felt better about a record this early since Mare Vitalis." The album is arguably more eclectic than any previous release in the band's catalogue, the Low Level Owl indebted instrumental "An Orange and a Blue" sitting alongside the more conventional, guitar-driven "February" and the stark, electronica of "Mountain Halo."Peregrine was released on March 21, 2006.

Richardson left the band in the early summer of 2006 and was replaced by Coker.

Sagarmatha
When asked about the next album (previously discussed as an entirely instrumental EP) in an interview, Crisci had said, "...the idea is still there, although it has morphed into a mostly instrumental full length.". Recording sessions were held at Black Lodge Recording in Eudora, Kansas, with Ed Rose after unsuccessful attempts to arrange John Congleton to helm the recording. Three demos, "Road West", "A Bright Light" and "Summer Before", were released as previews on the band's MySpace. Prior to the album's release, Coker left the band and Young followed shortly thereafter in order to return to school. They were replaced by John Momberg and Nate Whitman, respectively. Sagarmatha was released on February 17, 2009, and reached No. 25 on the Billboard Heatseekers chart.

Low Level Owl Live and documentary
On November 23, 2009, it was announced that the group has signed to Graveface Records. On the same day, the site announced that The Appleseed Cast would be touring with labelmates Dreamend in spring 2010, "playing their two classic albums, Low Level Owl Volume I and II back-to-back, each in its entirety". The announcement also mentioned that the band would have a live album for sale on the tour. The band was to be the subject of a documentary to be produced by 7446 films in cooperation with Graveface Records. The film will document the band revisiting its seminal work, while also focusing on the creation of Low Level Owl Volume I and II and the journey the band has taken to this point. The film was scheduled for a 2012 release.

Middle States EP and Illumination Ritual
In July 2010 Momberg mentioned in a blog post on the band's Myspace page that new material was being demoed. On February 26, 2011, Graveface Records uploaded a video via YouTube that gave updates as to the bands on their label, including The Appleseed Cast. The description of the video stated that a new EP, entitled Middle States, was slated to be released physically on June 7, 2011. The video also contains a sound clip demo of the title track.
 Track listing
 "End Frigate Constellation" (5:50)
 "Interlude" (2:55)
 "Middle States" (5:12)
 "Three Rivers" (14:03)

As of May 2012, The Appleseed Cast were in the process of recording their eighth full-length studio album. According to the band on its Facebook page, "It's definitely on the energetic side, but moody at the same time." Performances of one song are available on both their Facebook and YouTube pages.Illumination Ritual came out on April 23, 2013. The band toured extensively throughout the year in support of the album.

The Fleeting Light of Impermanence and current news
The band supported Caspian on a North American tour that ran from October 19 to November 19 2016. They released a new song titled "Asking The Fire For Medicine" in early January 2019 and announced they would head to the studio and begin recording a new album on January 20, 2019. Their new album "The Fleeting Light of Impermanence" was announced May 23, 2019 for a June 28, 2019 release on Graveface Records. The single "Time The Destroyer" was simultaneously released via Bandcamp. In Fall 2022 and Spring 2023, the band went on two tours opening for Sunny Day Real Estate.

Discography

Studio albums
 The End of the Ring Wars (Deep Elm, 1998)
 Mare Vitalis (Deep Elm, 2000)
 Low Level Owl: Volume I (Deep Elm, 2001)
 Low Level Owl: Volume II (Deep Elm, 2001)
 Two Conversations (Tiger Style, 2003)
 Peregrine (The Militia Group, 2006)
 Sagarmatha (The Militia Group, 2009)
 Illumination Ritual (Graveface, 2013)
 The Fleeting Light of Impermanence (Graveface, 2019)

Singles and EPs
 Tale of the Aftermath b/w Skatter Ik Ignito 7" (1998)
 Split (with Planes Mistaken For Stars and Race Car Riot, Deep Elm Records, 1999)
 Lost Songs (Deep Elm Records, 2002)
 Middle States (Graveface Records, 2011)

Compilations
 A Million Miles Away - The Emo Diaries No. 2 (Deep Elm Records, 1998) - Max Deep Elm Unreleased No. 2 (Deep Elm Records, 2003) - The Spider Wall Emo Is Awesome / Emo Is Evil 1 (Deep Elm Records, 2003) - Reaction, Forever Longing Golden Sunsets 
 Emo Is Awesome / Emo Is Evil 2 (Deep Elm Records, 2004) - Marigold & Patchwork 
 Kumquats and Apricots (The Militia Group, 2006) - Here We Are (Family In The Hallway) , Mountain Halo Graveface Sampler (Graveface Records, 2007) - Sila's Knife ''

References

External links

 
 MySpace Page
 Graveface Records Appleseed Page

American emo musical groups
Indie rock musical groups from Kansas
American post-rock groups
Musicians from Lawrence, Kansas
Musical groups established in 1997